Matt or Matthew Hughes may refer to:

 Matt Hughes (writer) (born 1949), Canadian science fiction writer
 Matt Hughes (fighter) (born 1973), American professional mixed martial artist
 Matt Hughes (rower) (born 1981), American Olympic rower
 Matthew Hughes (politician) (born 1950), Western Australian state politician
 Matthew Hughes (badminton) (born 1978), Welsh badminton player
 Matthew Hughes (runner) (born 1989), Canadian athlete
 Matthew Hughes (cricketer) (born 1996), English cricketer

See also
 Mathew Hughes (1822–1882), Victoria Cross recipient
 Hughes (surname)